Gloria Jean Wolberg Roesser (May 8, 1930 – October 2, 2017) was an American journalist and politician.

Roesser was born in Washington, D.C. She received her bachelor's degree in economics from Trinity College and took graduate courses in economics at the Catholic University of America. Roesser worked as a reporter for the Suburban Record newspaper in Montgomery County, Maryland. She lived in Potomac, Maryland. Roesser was involved with the Republican Party. She served in the Maryland House of Delegates from 1987 to 1995. She then served in the Maryland Senate from 1995 to 2003. From 2004 to 2007, Roesser served as secretary for the Maryland Department of Aging. Roesser died from leukemia in a hospital in Bethesda, Maryland.

Notes

1930 births
2017 deaths
Journalists from Washington, D.C.
People from Potomac, Maryland
Trinity Washington University alumni
Catholic University of America alumni
Journalists from Maryland
Women state legislators in Maryland
Republican Party members of the Maryland House of Delegates
Republican Party Maryland state senators
State cabinet secretaries of Maryland
Deaths from cancer in Maryland
Deaths from leukemia
21st-century American women